The sooty bushtit (Aegithalos fuliginosus) is a species of bird in the family Aegithalidae.
It is endemic to central China.

Its natural habitat is temperate forests.

It can also be known as the white-necklaced tit, white-necklaced bushtit, or the sooty tit.

References

sooty bushtit
Birds of Central China
Endemic birds of China
sooty bushtit
Taxonomy articles created by Polbot